The 2017 RBC Tennis Championships of Dallas was a professional tennis tournament played on hard courts. It was the 20th edition of the tournament and part of the 2017 ATP Challenger Tour. It took place in Dallas, United States between 30 January and 4 February 2017.

Singles main-draw entrants

Seeds

 1 Rankings are as of January 16, 2017.

Other entrants
The following players received wildcards into the singles main draw:
  Marcos Giron
  Mackenzie McDonald
  Eric Quigley
  Chase Wood

The following players received entry from the qualifying draw:
  Alejandro Gómez
  Christian Harrison
  Denys Molchanov
  Raymond Sarmiento

Champions

Singles

 Ryan Harrison def.  Taylor Fritz 6–3, 6–3.

Doubles

 David O'Hare /  Joe Salisbury def.  Jeevan Nedunchezhiyan /  Christopher Rungkat 6–7(6–8), 6–3, [11–9].

External links
Official Website

RBC Tennis Championships of Dallas
Challenger of Dallas
RBC Tennis Championships of Dallas
RBC Tennis Championships of Dallas
RBC Tennis Championships of Dallas
RBC Tennis Championships of Dallas